Nailed. Dead. Risen. is the debut studio album by American Christian deathcore band Impending Doom, released in 2007 on Facedown Records.

Background
Nailed. Dead. Risen. was tracked, mixed and mastered by Christopher Eck at Eck studios in Corona, California. The title for the album is a reference to the way Jesus Christ was crucified. It is the only album by the band to feature guitarist Greg Pewthers and drummer Andy Hegg. They were replaced by Cory Johnson (ex-Sleeping Giant) and Chad Blackwell, respectively.

The album features re-recordings of three songs from the band's demo album titled The Sin and Doom of Godless Men. The band even intended to completely re-record that demo into an EP, but due to them getting signed to a label faster than they even expected, they instead recorded this full-length album.

Track listing

Personnel
Impending Doom
 Brook Reeves – vocals
 Manny Contreras – lead guitar
 Greg Pewthers – rhythm guitar
 David Sittig – bass
 Andy Hegg – drums

Production
 Christopher Eck – production, mixing, mastering, recording
 Dave Quiggle – artwork

References

2007 debut albums
Facedown Records albums
Impending Doom albums